Xinshi is a town in and the seat of Jingshan County in Jingmen, east-central Hubei province, China. The towns geographical coordinates are 31° 1' 19" North, 113° 6' 11".

Administrative divisions
, it has 10 residential communities and 25 villages under its administration.

Communities:
Yundu, Wenbifeng, Zhonggulou, Sanjiaozhou, Guihuatai, Dongguan, Chengfan, Xinyang, Fenghuangyan

Villages:
Gaochao, Wusi, Shuixiakou, Baigudong, Hongquan, Yanhao, Siling, Hehuayan, Dingjiabang, Gaoling, Xiongtan, Chenbazi, Dazhu, Tianwang, Bazimen, Shengjing, Wangjiaguai, Longquanshan, Huolong, Xiaohuanling

See also
List of township-level divisions of Hubei

References

Township-level divisions of Hubei
Jingmen